Phat mi Khorat or Pad mee Korat is a stir-fried rice noodle Thai style dish commonly served with papaya salad (som tam) in Thailand. Dried rice noodle (many colors) is a specific ingredient for phat mi Khorat. It is made with dried rice noodle, garlic, shallot, pork, salt soya, beans, fish sauce, palm sugar, red pepper, black soy sauce, water, spring onion and bean sprouts. A dish of phat mi Khorat is thought to have been introduced to Nakhon Ratchasima Province, Thailand, in ancient times. In the past, most people in Nakhon Ratchasima (for short: Khorat) commonly were farmers. They preserved old rice by transforming it to dried rice noodles. In religious ceremonies, phat mi Khorat is served due to the ease of finding ingredients although these versions tend to use ordinary noodles.

Thai cuisine